The Women's sprint competition at the Biathlon World Championships 2021 was held on 13 February 2021.

Results
The race was started at 14:30.

References

Women's sprint